Maceration is the process of preparing foods through the softening or breaking into pieces using a liquid.

Raw, dried or preserved fruit or vegetables are soaked in a liquid to soften the food, or absorb the flavor of the liquid into the food. 

In the case of fresh fruit, particularly soft fruit such as strawberries and raspberries, the fruit is often simply sprinkled with sugar (and sometimes a small amount of salt) and left to sit and release its own juices. This process makes the food more flavorful and easier to chew and digest.

Maceration is often confused with marination, which is the process of soaking foods in a seasoned, often acidic, liquid before cooking.

Some herbal preparations call for maceration, as it is one way to extract delicate or highly volatile herbal essences without applying heat.

Sometimes a cooking oil is used as the liquid for maceration – especially olive or some other vegetable oil.

Maceration is the chief means of producing a flavored alcoholic beverage, such as cordials and liqueurs.

Maceration of byproducts from food processing plants and other organic byproducts such as cooking oil, stubble, wood chips or manure can involve the use of a chopper pump to create a slurry which can be used to create compost or co-digestion feedstock in biogas plants (or both).

Ritual foods
In Mandaeism, hamra is made by macerating raisins mixed in water blessed by priests.

See also
 Food processor

References

Cooking techniques
Culinary terminology